Albert II (1368 – January 21, 1397, Kelheim) was duke of Bavaria-Straubing alongside his father Albert I, who also ruled the counties of Holland, Hainaut, and Zeeland in the Low Countries. Additionally, from 1389 until his death in 1397, he administered the Bavarian province of Straubing in the name of his father, it being his Bavarian ducal line's appanage and seat. Albert II's mother was Margaret of Brieg, great-granddaughter of Wenceslaus II of Bohemia.

Albert II spent most of his time in Straubing, arranged tournaments, ordered the introduction of road surfaces but also encouraged the church. He did not intervene in the internal conflict of his cousins, the three sons of his uncle Duke Stephen II of Bavaria, but supported their war against a confederation of cities in Swabia and the archbishop of Salzburg. Albert visited the Low Countries several times and fought against the Frisians in 1396 alongside his father and his elder brother William II. Albert died after his return journey, in Kelheim.

1368 births
1397 deaths
14th-century dukes of Bavaria
Counts of Holland
House of Wittelsbach